Sphecodes crassus, common name swollen-thighed blood bee, is a species of bee. It was described by Carl Gustaf Thomson in 1870.

References

Halictidae
Insects described in 1870